The 1999–2000 season was the 96th season in the history of FC Schalke 04 and the club's ninth consecutive season in the top flight of German football.

Season summary
Schalke had a poor season, finishing in 13th place - only four points clear of relegation.

First team squad
Squad at end of season

Left club during season

Competitions

Bundesliga

League table

References

Notes

FC Schalke 04 seasons
FC Schalke 04